Froelichia juncea is a plant species native to the Galápagos Islands of Ecuador. There are two subspecies of F. juncea: F. juncea subsp. juncea and F. juncea subsp. alata. F. juncea subsp. alata was first described by Thomas J. Howell.

References

juncea
Flora of the Galápagos Islands
Vulnerable plants